Vernon Shearer was a South African politician.

Career 
He was the Member of Parliament for Durban Point.

He later served as Mayor of Durban after leaving parliament.

Two of his grandsons, Robin Smith and Chris Smith played cricket for England.

References

External links 
 https://core.ac.uk/download/pdf/43176526.pdf : the 1961 South African general election

20th-century South African politicians
Mayors of Durban
Members of the House of Assembly (South Africa)
People from Durban
Independent politicians